Operation Gideon was a Haganah offensive launched in the closing days of the British Mandate in Palestine.

Operation Gideon may also refer to:
El Junquito raid of 2018, codenamed Operation Gideon
Operation Gideon (2020), a dissident military operation in Venezuela